Jacobs Entertainment, Inc. is a gaming, hospitality, and entertainment company based in Golden, Colorado.

History
The company was formed by Cleveland real estate developer Jeffrey Jacobs. In 1995, it announced a joint venture with Black Hawk Gaming & Development to build a casino hotel in Black Hawk, Colorado. Jacobs was also reported to be exploring gaming opportunities in 10 other states and South Africa and Aruba. Later that year, the company purchased 50 percent of Colonial Downs, a horse track under development in New Kent, Virginia, for $5 million, and was negotiating to purchase River Downs, an Ohio horse track.

In 1996, the company made a $9 million investment in the Boardwalk Casino on the Las Vegas Strip.

The Lodge Casino, the company's $73-million joint venture with Black Hawk Gaming, opened in 1998, with Jacobs owning a 25 percent share.

In 2002, Jeffrey Jacobs and his father, Richard Jacobs, consolidated their gaming holdings into a reorganized Jacobs Entertainment, which simultaneously purchased all outstanding shares of Black Hawk Gaming & Development and Colonial Holdings. The combined company at that point owned the Lodge Casino and Gilpin Casino in Black Hawk; the Gold Dust West Casino in Reno, Nevada; Colonial Downs racetrack; and six truck stop casinos in Louisiana.

The company applied for a license to operate a casino in Orange County, Indiana in 2003, but withdrew its bid in the face of stiff competition. It also made plans to develop a casino in D'Iberville, Mississippi, but pulled out of the project in 2004.

Jacobs held discussions about buying New York racetrack Vernon Downs in 2005, and Casino Aztar Caruthersville in Missouri in 2007, but neither acquisition materialized.

In 2006, Jacobs spent over $2 million in support of an Ohio ballot measure that would have authorized the company to open a casino at the Nautica Entertainment Complex, owned by Jeffrey Jacobs. The measure failed.

Jacobs purchased the Piñon Plaza casino in Carson City, Nevada in 2006 for $14.5 million, and rebranded it as the Gold Dust West Carson City. The company opened its third casino under the Gold Dust West name in Elko, Nevada in 2007.

In 2008 and 2009, the company bought out the shares of Richard Jacobs, leaving his son as the sole owner.

The company acquired the Nautica Entertainment Complex from Jeffrey Jacobs in phases between 2008 and 2012. It then purchased the Greater Cleveland Aquarium, located in the complex, in 2014.

Jacobs offered itself for sale to MTR Gaming in 2013 for $145 million in stock, but withdrew the offer after MTR agreed to be acquired by Eldorado Resorts. The Jacobses had begun purchasing shares in MTR Gaming in 2006, eventually accumulating an 18 percent stake in the company. Later in the year, Jacobs made a competing offer to buy MTR, and then withdrew it after Eldorado increased its offer.

Since 2008, Jacobs has pursued plans to develop a casino in Diamondhead, Mississippi. The state gaming commission rejected the proposal in March 2017, but the company filed an appeal.

Jacobs purchased the Sands Regency Casino Hotel in Reno, a few blocks away from the Gold Dust West casino, for $30 million in July 2017. The company soon began a $500-million plan to redevelop the corridor between the two casinos with mixed-use developments and retail and entertainment venues.

In April 2018, Jacobs sold Colonial Downs, which had been closed since 2014. The track was sold to Revolutionary Racing, a Chicago-based group of investors and gaming executives, for a price of more than $20 million.

Properties

 Cash Magic – 22 truck stop casinos located throughout Louisiana
 Gilpin Casino – Black Hawk, Colorado
 Gold Dust West Carson City – Carson City, Nevada
 Gold Dust West Elko – Elko, Nevada
 Gold Dust West Reno – Reno, Nevada
 J Resort – Reno, Nevada (formerly Sands Regency Casino Hotel)
 Lodge Casino – Black Hawk, Colorado
 Nautica Entertainment Complex – Cleveland, Ohio
 Greater Cleveland Aquarium
 Jacobs Pavilion at Nautica
 M/V Nautica Queen Cleveland's Dining Cruise Ship

Former properties
 Colonial Downs – New Kent County, Virginia (sold in 2018)

References

External links
 

Companies based in Golden, Colorado
Gambling companies of the United States
Hospitality companies of the United States